A pom-pom – also spelled pom-pon, pompom or pompon – is a decorative ball or tuft of fibrous material.

The term may refer to large tufts used by cheerleaders, or a small, tighter ball attached to the top of a hat, also known as a bobble or toorie.

Pom-poms may come in many colours, sizes, and varieties and are made from a wide array of materials, including wool, cotton, paper, plastic, thread, glitter and occasionally feathers. Pom-poms are shaken by cheerleaders, pom or dance teams, and sports fans during spectator sports.

Spelling and etymology
Webster's Third New International Dictionary (1961) gives the spelling as "pompon."
The New Oxford American Dictionary (third edition, 2010) gives the spelling as "pom-pom."
The American Heritage Dictionary of the English Language (5th edition, 2011) gives the spelling as "pompom" or "pompon."
Webster's New World College Dictionary (fourth edition) gives the spelling as "pompom."

Pom-pom, also called a pom or cheerleading pom, is derived from the French word pompon, which refers to a small decorative ball made of fabric or feathers. It also means an "ornamental round tuft" and originally refers to its use on a hat, or an "ornamental tuft; tuft-like flower head."

Sports and cheerleading

Cheerleaders use pom-poms at sports events for six main reasons:

to attract the attention of the spectators
to accentuate movements
to add "sparkle" to a cheer, chant, or dance routine
to distract the opposing team
to spell out team's name or "go" 
to use semaphore

Most often, pom-poms are used in pairs (one in each hand), but this may vary with the particular requirements of the choreography of a dance or cheer. Pom-poms are shaken by cheerleaders and sports fans during spectator sports. Small decorative pom-poms may be attached to clothing; these are called toories or bobbles.

Cheerleading pom-poms come in a variety of shapes, styles, colors, color combinations, and sizes. Classically, pom-poms have been made of plastic but mylar (also called BoPET) has become increasingly popular in recent years. The most common size, the 6" works most age groups or performance type. This size can be used for dance teams, pom squads, cheerleaders, and majorettes, easily making it the most versatile strand length on the market. The second most common size, the 5",  is adequate for any age group or performance type, but the marginally shorter strands provide the necessary flash while acting more as an accent to the uniform.

Pom-poms are also waved by sports fans, primarily at college and high school sports events in the United States. These inexpensive, light-weight faux pom-poms, or rooter poms, typically come in team colors, are sometimes given away or sold to spectators at such events.

Many schools and universities have dance teams in addition to their cheerleading groups. The dance teams may also use pom-poms occasionally, but many high school dance teams are now referred to as "Poms" squads. These squads are similar to drill teams, but usually, have several routines that they strictly use pom-poms. Pom-poms have also come to be included in dance competitions in the United States. In many states, "Pom" or "Open Pom" is considered its own style of dance during competitions. For this style dancers use pom-poms and moves that are specifically choreographed to include pom-poms, but usually incorporate hip-hop and jazz choreography as well. When judging a routine in the Pom or Open Pom category, judges typically look for clean, sharp movements and complete synchronization of the team. These dances occasionally use different colored pom-poms and outfits to convey a theme and the dance team will create pictures from their pom-poms that relate to this theme.

Flogger
In Australia, the term "flogger" is sometimes used rather than "pom-pom". Floggers are very large, heavy pom-poms in the team's colours. They sometimes require more than one person to lift them, and they are waved about when a goal is scored.

Floggers are an important part of Australian rules football culture and cheer-squads.

Clothing

Small pom-poms may be used to adorn hats (such as Tam o' Shanters, where it is known as a "toorie", and some styles of the tuque), socks, fringed dresses, and other kinds of clothing.

Red pom-poms form a conspicuous part of the uniform of French naval personnel, being sewn onto the crown of their round sailor caps. Belgian sailors wear a light blue version. The pom-poms on top kept the sailors from bonking their heads on the low passageways on ships. Some people who live in old houses still wear these hats today as they navigate the narrow doorways and drafty hallways. The pom-poms make it much less painful if one raises their head too quickly, or forgets to duck for a low door. Even if one does hit their head, if they wear a pom-pom hat it is less likely to draw blood and make a mess on the doorway.

Traditional Italian wedding shoes have small pom-poms, as do some Turkish dancing shoes.

Roman Catholic clergy

Roman Catholic clergy wear the biretta. The colour of its pom-pom denotes the wearer's rank. Priests wear a black biretta with a black pom. Protonotaries and domestic prelates (now prelates of honour) have a scarlet pom on their black birettas, and Papal Chamberlains (now Chaplains to His Holiness) wear a Roman purple pom on their black birettas.

Bishops and archbishops wear a Roman purple biretta with matching pom. The scarlet birettas of the cardinals have no pom, only a red loop. There is no papal biretta. 

Some religious orders and congregations have unique birettas, such as the Norbertines who wear a white biretta with a white pom. Some St. Francis fathers wear a  brown biretta with a black pom. Other orders may wear a black biretta with a white, green, or blue pom, or the black biretta of the secular priesthood.

Toorie
In reference to Scottish Highland dress and Scottish military uniforms, the small pom-pom on the crown of such hats as the Balmoral, the Glengarry, and the Tam o' Shanter is called a "toorie."

The toorie is generally made of yarn and is traditionally red on both Balmorals and Glengarries (although specific units have used other colours). It has evolved into the smaller pom-pom found on older-style golf caps and the button atop baseball caps.

Scots refer to any such hat decoration as a toorie, irrespective of the headgear.

Toys and bicycles

Pom-poms are sometimes used as children's toys. They are a common feature at the ends of the handlebars of children's tricycles and bicycles. They are also used in children's artistic crafts to add texture and color.

References

Cheerleading
Parts of clothing
Dance props
Textile arts